Yedynomu (— literally "To the Only One") - is the third studio album of Sofia Rotaru, recorded in Ukraine. The album was released in 2003 in Ukraine and Russia with 16 tracks with consequent worldwide release. This album appeared after a pause in Rotaru's career caused by the death of her husband Anatoliy Evdokimenko and is a tribute to his memory.

The album includes major super hits of the 1970s to 1990s period of the joint life and working partnership of Sofia Rotaru and Anatoliy Evdokimenko.  Anatoliy was a long-time working partner, helping to direct and produce many of her songs. The album was released exactly on the anniversary of death of her husband As of January 2004, more than 2,000,000 copies were sold.

Track listing

Languages of performance 
Songs are performed in Ukrainian and Romanian languages.

References

External links 
 Official CD Discography of Sofia Rotaru
 "Fortuna" Fan Club

2003 albums
Sofia Rotaru albums